The Ohosu Game Reserve is located in Edo State, Nigeria.

References

Game Reserves of Nigeria